Pietro Antonio Da Ponte, C.R. (1574–1622) was a Roman Catholic prelate who served as Bishop of Troia (1607–1622) and Apostolic Nuncio to Gratz (1610–1613).

Biography
Pietro Antonio Da Ponte was born in Naples, Italy in 1574 and ordained a priest in the Congregation of Clerics Regular of the Divine Providence.
On 14 May 1607, he was appointed during the papacy of Pope Paul V as Bishop of Troia.
On 20 May 1607, he was consecrated bishop by Marcello Lante della Rovere, Bishop of Todi, with Giovanni Battista del Tufo, Bishop Emeritus of Acerra, and Giovanni Vitelli, Bishop of Carinola, serving as co-consecrators. 
On 9 October 1610, he was appointed during the papacy of Pope Paul V as Apostolic Nuncio to Gratz; he resigned from the post on 16 October 1613.
He served as Bishop of Troia until his death on 8 September 1622.

While bishop, he was the principal co-consecrator of Filippo Bigli, Bishop of Cagli (1610) and Ottavio Orsini, Bishop of Venafro (1621).

References

External links and additional sources
 
 (for Chronology of Bishops) 
 (for Chronology of Bishops) 

17th-century Italian Roman Catholic bishops
Bishops appointed by Pope Paul V
1574 births
1622 deaths
Theatine bishops
Clergy from Naples